This is a list of holidays in Sudan.
The following public holidays are the same every year:
 January 1: Independence Day
 January 7: Coptic Christmas
 December 19: Revolution Day
 December 25: Christmas Day
Variable (Islamic holidays are fixed to the Islamic calendar which follows the phases of the moon, therefore holidays will be 10 to 11 days earlier in the Gregorian calendar every year. Furthermore, Islamic holidays depend on the sighting of the moon.)
 The Prophet's Birthday
 Eid al-Fitr
 Islamic New Year
 Eid al-Adha
 Coptic Easter

References 

Sudanese culture
Sudan
Holidays
Sudan